Elmer Lois Tarbox (March 7, 1916 – November 2, 1987) was an American military aviator, businessman, and politician. Tarbox served as a member of the Texas House of Representatives from 1967–1977.

Early years 
Elmer Tarbox was born in Bishop, Oklahoma on March 7, 1916 to Jake Tarbox and May Tarbox (née Riley). Tarbox was raised in the Texas Panhandle city of Higgins, Texas.

Education 
Tarbox attended Texas Technological College (now Texas Tech University) and lettered in Red Raiders basketball, Red Raiders football, and Red Raiders track teams. Along with Jerry Dowd from the Saint Mary's Gaels, Tarbox was named Co-Outstanding Player in the 1939 Cotton Bowl Classic. He graduated with a Bachelor of Business Administration degree from Texas Tech in 1939. The same year, Tarbox was selected 18th overall in the 1939 NFL Draft by the Cleveland Rams but chose not play professional football.

World War II 
At the beginning of World War II, Tarbox enlisted in the United States Army Air Corps. Under the command of Claire Lee Chennault, he piloted B-25 bombers in the China Burma India Theater as a member of the 1st American Volunteer Group, nicknamed the "Flying Tigers." Tarbox was awarded an Air Medal, a Silver Star, and a Purple Heart. Upon discharge, Tarbox returned to Lubbock, Texas.

Political career 
In 1966, Tarbox ran successfully for the 76th District in the Texas House of Representatives. Tarbox was reelected twice to the same district and twice more in the 75th District. While a member of the legislature, he served on the appropriations committee that established the Texas Tech University School of Law and what is now the Texas Tech University Health Sciences Center (TTUHSC).

Personal life 
From 1946–1947, Tarbox served as president of the Texas Technological College Alumni and Ex-Students Association (now known as the Texas Tech Alumni Association). He married Maxine Barnett on March 29, 1944, and they had four children before she died in 1978. Tarbox founded the Tarbox Parkinson's Disease Institute in 1972 at the TTUHSC, to help develop a treatment and cure for Parkinson's disease, from which he suffered. On November 2, 1987, Tarbox died of complications of Parkinsonism and was buried at Resthaven Cemetery in Lubbock.

See also
 List of NCAA major college football yearly receiving leaders

References

External links 
Legislative Reference Library of Texas profile
The Tarbox Parkinson's Disease Institute

1916 births
1987 deaths
Democratic Party members of the Texas House of Representatives
People from Lubbock, Texas
Deaths from Parkinson's disease
Recipients of the Air Medal
Texas Tech Red Raiders football players
Texas Tech Red Raiders basketball players
Recipients of the Silver Star
20th-century American businesspeople
20th-century American politicians
American men's basketball players
United States Army Air Forces bomber pilots of World War II
Neurological disease deaths in Texas
Military personnel from Texas